Citlalli Gaona-Tiburcio is a Mexican materials scientist whose research interests include the treatment of metal-reinforced concrete for resistance to corrosion, and the development of composite materials for extreme environments including high-temperature and aerospace applications. She is a professor and researcher in the Center for Research and Innovation in Aeronautical Engineering, in the Faculty of Mechanical and Electrical Engineering of the Autonomous University of Nuevo León (UANL).

Education and career
Gaona-Tiburcio did her undergraduate studies in metallurgical engineering at UAM Azcapotzalco, graduating in 1993. She earned a master's degree in the subject from the National Autonomous University of Mexico in 1997, and completed a doctorate in 1999 through the Centro de Investigación en Materiales Avanzados (CIMAV).

She continued to work as a researcher for CIMAV from 1995 to 2011. In 2013 she took her present position as a professor and researcher at UANL.

Recognition
Gaona-Tiburcio is a member of the Mexican Academy of Sciences.

References

External links

Year of birth missing (living people)
Living people
Mexican engineers
Mexican women engineers
Materials scientists and engineers
Women materials scientists and engineers
Universidad Autónoma Metropolitana alumni
National Autonomous University of Mexico alumni
Academic staff of the Autonomous University of Nuevo León
Members of the Mexican Academy of Sciences